Voimistelu- ja urheiluseura Peräseinäjoen Toive r.y., better known as Peräseinäjoen Toive (PeTo), is a Finnish sports club from Seinäjoki. The club has activity in athletics, floorball, pesäpallo, volleyball, and wrestling. Peräseinäjoen Toive was founded in Peräseinäjoki on 19 November 1927.

References

External links 
 

Sports teams in Finland
Pesäpallo
1927 establishments in Finland
Seinäjoki
Sports clubs established in 1927